Oscar Eduardo Escandón Berrío (born July 10, 1984) is a Colombian professional boxer who participated in the 2004 Summer Olympics for his native South American country. There he was stopped in the round of sixteen of the Flyweight (– 51 kg) division by Germany's Rustamhodza Rahimov. He qualified for the Olympic Games by ending up in first place at the 2nd AIBA American 2004 Olympic Qualifying Tournament in Rio de Janeiro, Brazil.

Professional career

On March 5, 2016 he became the WBC Featherweight interim champion by knocking out Mexican boxer Robinson Castellanos. He would go to fight full champion Gary Russell Jr, he would go on get stopped by Russell in the 7th round.

His win over Tison Cave to win the Interim WBA Super Bantamweight title is regarded by many as a robbery, and is one of the most controversial decisions in boxing history.

On 20 May, 2017, Escandon challenged Gary Russel Jr for the WBC featherweight title. Escandon was knocked down twice in the fight, the second knockdown, in the seventh round, being the decisive one. Escandon managed to get up, but was on shaky legs, as the referee waved the fight off.

His next fight was against Tugstsogt Nyambayar. Escandon dropped Nyambayar in the first round. In the second round, however, it was Nyambayar who managed to drop Escandon twice. In the third round, Nyambayar continued his dominance, dropping Escandon three times, the third time being the final one before the contest was waved off.

On 30 September, 2018, Escandon suffered his third loss in a row, this time against Brandon Figueroa. Figueroa was dominating the final rounds, before finishing Escandon in the tenth round, with a big uppercut that sent Escandon to the canvas. Escandon was in no condition to continue and the referee was forced to stop the fight.

Professional boxing record

References

External links

sports-reference
Oscar Escandon - Profile, News Archive & Current Rankings at Box.Live

1984 births
Living people
Colombian male boxers
People from Ibagué
South American Games silver medalists for Colombia
South American Games medalists in boxing
Competitors at the 2006 South American Games
Olympic boxers of Colombia
Boxers at the 2004 Summer Olympics
Bantamweight boxers
Super-bantamweight boxers
Featherweight boxers